Tomkinson, sometimes spelled Tompkinson, is a surname, derived from the given name Thomas.  Rarer spelling variants include Thompkinson, Tonkeson, and Tumkynson.

Surnames
 Francis Tomkinson (1883–1963), Cricket player
 Geoffrey Tomkinson (1881–1963), Cricket player
 Henry Tomkinson (1831–1906), English cricketer and rower
 Henry Archdale Tomkinson (1881–1937), British polo champion
 James Tomkinson (1840–1910), British politician and landowner
 Samuel Tomkinson (1816–1900), Australian politician
 Stephen Tompkinson (born 1965), English actor
 Thomas Tomkinson (1631–1710), English Muggletonian writer
 Wilfred Tomkinson (1877–1971), vice-admiral
 William Tomkinson (1790–1872), British Army officer, author of The Diary of a Cavalry Officer: In the Peninsular and Waterloo Campaigns, 1809–1815 (published 1894)

See also
Palmer-Tomkinson, a British double-barrelled name
Tomkinson Ranges, Southwest Australia (Named after politician Samuel Tomkinson, 1851–1900)
Mead & Tomkinson racing, a Herefordshire-base endurance team that developed innovative racing bikes

External links
 Tomkinson Family History
 Download transcription (zip file) of Genealogical Memoirs of various Families of Tomkinson (1620–1904), published in 1904 by Newton Powers Tomkinson
 Download pdf file of https://archive.org/details/AnniediariesAnnieTomkinsonOfFrancheHallKeptFrom18841920. Annie-Diaries Annie Tomkinson of Franche Hall kept from 1884 to 1920.

English-language surnames
Patronymic surnames
Surnames from given names